USS Connolly (DE-306) was an  of the United States Navy during World War II. She was sent off into the Pacific Ocean to protect convoys and other ships from Japanese submarines and fighter aircraft. She performed escort and antisubmarine operations in dangerous battle areas and returned home with two battle stars.

Namesake
John Gaynor Connolly was born on 28 April 1893 in Savannah, Georgia. He enlisted in the Navy on 6 October 1913. He served in Russia, China, the Philippines and on many ships. On 13 March 1926, he was commissioned Chief Pay Clerk.

Construction and commissioning
Connolly was launched on 15 January 1944 by Mare Island Navy Yard; sponsored by Mrs. Mary Francis Connolly, commissioned on 8 July 1944 and reported to the Pacific Fleet.

World War II Pacific Theater operations 
Connolly operated in Hawaiian waters on training from 24 September 1944 until 22 January 1945, when she sailed for duty in the Iwo Jima operation from 19 February until 1 March. She patrolled off the island to protect shipping and providing direct support to the landings. After screening transports to Espiritu Santo, Connolly guarded the convoy to Okinawa, arriving off the Hagushi beaches on 9 April. She served on antisubmarine patrol until sailing for repairs at Ulithi on 4 May.
 
Connolly arrived off Okinawa again in the screen of a resupply convoy on 6 June 1945, then joined the screen of amphibious ships carrying out subsidiary landings in the Nansei Shoto until she reported in Leyte Gulf on 14 July to join the forces of the Philippine Sea Frontier. Between 17 July and 12 August, she voyaged to Okinawa on escort duty, then operated in the Philippines until 7 September, when she cleared Manila for Eniwetok, Pearl Harbor, San Pedro, Los Angeles, and Charleston, South Carolina.

Post-War decommissioning 
She arrived in Charleston on 2 November, where she was decommissioned on 22 November 1945 and sold for scrapping on 20 May 1946.

Awards  
Connolly received two battle stars for World War II service.

References

External links
 

 

Evarts-class destroyer escorts
World War II frigates and destroyer escorts of the United States
Ships built in Vallejo, California
1944 ships